Free Party Canada is a minor federal political party in Canada. It is led by Michel Leclerc, advocates for direct democracy and lower taxes, and promotes vaccine hesitancy.

History 
Its eight candidates in the 2018 Quebec general election received a total of 1,618 votes. Registered federally on September 30, 2020, its first federal campaign was for the 2020 Toronto Centre federal by-election.

2021 election 
The party ran 59 candidates in the 2021 Canadian federal election, most of them in Quebec or in Francophone areas of New Brunswick and Ontario, garnering over 47,000 votes. Its platform attracted notice for its opposition to mandated COVID vaccination and vaccination passports, and some candidates had been active in organising events opposed to the pandemic health measures. The party also called for the introduction of a direct democracy and lower taxes. Other candidates raised issues of housing affordability, transport and local accountability to electors. Party leader Michel Leclerc ran in Laurentides—Labelle, where he had been an independent candidate in the 2019 Canadian federal election. In an interview with a TVA comedian at an anti-vaccination rally, Leclerc claimed that viruses were humans, that vaccinations decreased life expectancy, and (claiming to be trained as an astronaut) denied the moon landing.

Election results

Federal

Municipal (Saint-Sauveur)

References 

2020 establishments in Canada
Political parties established in 2020
Federal political parties in Canada
Anti-vaccination organizations